The King Chulalongkorn Memorial Building is a Thai pavilion (Sala Thai) in Utanede, Sweden (part of the Ragunda Municipality) built to commemorate the 1897 visit of King Chulalongkorn of Thailand to the town.

The construction of the building started in August 1997 and it was inaugurated on July 19, 1998, at the 101 anniversary of King Chulalongkorn's visit.

The building is in the style of a royal Thai pavilion (prasat) with a surface of ten by ten meters and a height of 28 meters. The roof is supported by 24 pillars in white concrete around the building with its four entrances.

The pavilion is adorned with gold leaf ornamentation with a value of three million Swedish kronor or 14 million Thai baht.

References

External links 
 

Jämtland
Traditional Thai architecture
Thai culture
Buildings and structures in Jämtland County
Tourist attractions in Jämtland County
Sweden–Thailand relations
Monuments and memorials to Chulalongkorn